Equal Exchange is a for-profit, Fairtrade worker-owned cooperative headquartered in West Bridgewater, Massachusetts. Equal Exchange distributes organic, gourmet coffee, tea, sugar, bananas, avocados, cocoa, and chocolate bars produced by farmer cooperatives in Latin America, Africa, and Asia. Founded in 1986, it is the oldest and largest Fair Trade coffee company in the United States. The highest paid employee of Equal Exchange may not make more than four times what the lowest paid employee receives.

History
Equal Exchange was founded in 1986 by Rink Dickinson, Jonathan Rosenthal, and Michael Rozyne. Before founding Equal Exchange, Dickinson, Rosenthal, and Rozyne were managers at a food cooperative in New England, and were actively involved in American food industry reform.

For three years prior to Equal Exchange's birth, the three founders met once weekly to discuss how global food trade could be changed to increase incomes and stabilize economic situations of farmers. The meetings resulted in the development of an alternative trade model that utilized direct trade, established long-term contracts, and offered higher-than-market prices to small coffee farmers. This differs from the traditional trade model, in which buyers go through a series of middlemen to purchase coffee beans from plantation farmers.

Café
Equal Exchange operates three cafés in the United States. The cafés, located in Washington, Illinois, and Ohio, serve Equal Exchange tea, coffee, and espresso drinks as well as locally sourced pastries, sandwiches, and other lunch items.

EEUK
Equal Exchange co-operative based in the UK has close ties to Equal Exchange US where they both share various product lines and farmer co-op producers. Both share the same name and produce coffee, chocolate, and cocoa products among many other items. This relationship was made permanent in 2017 when EE Wholesale UK became a subsidiary of Equal Exchange US.

See also
 List of bean-to-bar chocolate manufacturers
Lorna Young

References

External links
Official website

Alternative trading organizations
Coffee brands
Fair trade brands
Coffee companies of the United States
Worker cooperatives of the United States
Companies based in Massachusetts
Organic chocolate
Confectionery companies of the United States